Union-Endicott Central School District is a school district headquartered in Endicott, New York.

Schools
Secondary:
Union-Endicott High School
Jennie F. Snapp Middle School
Elementary:
Charles G. Johnson Jr. Elementary School
George F. Johnson Elementary School
Ann G. McGuinness Elementary School
Thomas J. Watson Elementary School
Other:
Linnaeus W. West School

References

External links
 

School districts in New York (state)
Education in Broome County, New York